Picayune  Creek is a stream in Johnson County, Iowa, in the United States. It is a tributary to Dirty Face Creek.

Picayune was so named because a pioneer who settled on the creek charged one picayune for salting a calf.

See also
List of rivers of Iowa

References

Rivers of Johnson County, Iowa
Rivers of Iowa